Fegen can refer to:
Fegen (lake), a lake in southern Sweden
Fegen (locality), a village situated on the southern shore of the lake
Edward Stephen Fogarty Fegen (1891-1940), Irish Victoria Cross recipient

See also
 Fegan, a surname